This is a list of the past and present mayors of Woburn, Massachusetts.

References

Woburn